Striariidae is a family of millipedes in the order Chordeumatida. Adult millipedes in this family have 30 segments (counting the collum as the first segment and the telson as the last). There are at least 3 genera and about 13 described species in Striariidae.

Genera
There are currently three recognized genera in the family Striariidae: 
Amplaria 
Striaria Bollman, 1888
 Vaferia Causey, 1958

References

Further reading

 
 
 
 

Chordeumatida
Millipede families